Cancellaria cooperii, common name Cooper's nutmeg, is a species of medium-sized to large sea snail, a marine gastropod mollusk in the family Cancellariidae, the nutmeg snails.

Description

Ecology

Life habits
This species is an ectoparasite that parasitizes the Pacific electric ray, Torpedo californica, and perhaps other benthic fishes. Cooper's nutmeg is uncommonly found, offshore, on sandy substrate.

Distribution
This nutmeg snail occurs in the Eastern Pacific Ocean from Monterey, California, to San Benito Island, in central Baja California, Mexico.

References

Link to Biol. Bull. article

External links
 McLean, James H., 1978, Marine Shells of Southern California, Natural History Museum of Los Angeles County Museum, Science Series 24, Revised Edition, p 51.

Cancellariidae
Parasitic protostomes
Animal parasites of fish
Gastropods described in 1865
Hematophages